Serapio Bwemi Magambo (8 May 1928–8 February 1995), was a Ugandan Catholic priest who served as the Bishop of the Roman Catholic Diocese of Fort Portal, from 16 November 1972 until his resignation on 17 June 1991. Prior to that, he served as the Auxiliary Bishop of Fort Portal from 26 June 1969 until 16 November 1972.

Background and priesthood
Magambo was born on 8 May 1928, in Kyaka Village, in present-day Kyegegwa District, in the Toro sub-region, in the Western Region of Uganda. He was ordained a priest on 15 December 1957 and served as priest of the Diocese of Fort Portal, until 26 June 1969.

As bishop
Magambo was appointed Auxiliary Bishop of Fort Portal on 26 June 1969 and was consecrated a bishop at Kololo, in the Archdiocese of Kampala, by Pope Paul VI, assisted by Archbishop Sergio Pignedoli, Titular Archbishop of Iconium, and Archbishop Emmanuel Kiwanuka Nsubuga, Archbishop of Kampala. 

He served as auxiliary bishop of Fort Portal until 16 November 1972, when he was appointed bishop of the diocese. He served as the ordinary of the diocese until he resigned on 17 June 1991. He died on 8 February 1995, as Bishop Emeritus of Fort Portal, Uganda, at the age of 66 years and 9 months.

Succession table

References

External links
 Profile of the Roman Catholic Diocese of Fort Portal
 Homily of His Holiness John Paul II, delivered at Kasese, Uganda On Monday, 8 February 1993.

1928 births
1995 deaths
People from Kyegegwa District
20th-century Roman Catholic bishops in Uganda
Roman Catholic bishops of Fort Portal